Echo Lake may refer to:

Canada 
 Echo Lake (Saskatchewan), a lake in Saskatchewan
 Lost Echo Lake, a lake in Saskatchewan
 Echo Lake Provincial Park, in British Columbia
 Echo Valley Provincial Park, in Saskatchewan
 Echo Lake, Lake of Bays, Lake of Bays, Ontario

United States 
 Echo Lake, California, a town
 Echo Lake (California), a lake near the town
 Echo Lake (Colorado), a lake in the Rocky Mountains of Colorado, located within Echo Lake Park
 Echo Lake (Maine), a lake in Fayette, Mount Vernon and Readfield Maine
 Echo Lake (Montana), a lake near Bigfork, Montana
 Echo Lake (Nevada), a lake in the Ruby Mountains
 Echo Lake (Franconia Notch), a lake in Franconia Notch State Park in New Hampshire
 Echo Lake (North Conway), a lake in the White Mountains of New Hampshire
 Echo Lake State Park, North Conway, New Hampshire
 Echo Lake (New York), a mountain lake in the Indian Head Wilderness of the Catskill Mountains of New York
 Echo Lake (Charleston, Vermont), a lake
 Echo Lake, Washington, a community

Other uses 
 Echo Lake (band), an English alternative rock band formed in London in 2010
 Echo Lake (software), multimedia software produced by Delrina
 Echo Lake Entertainment, a film and television production company; see Doug Mankoff
 A themed area at Disney's Hollywood Studios in Florida

See also